Raj Bhavan (translation: Government House)  is the official residence of the governor of Andhra Pradesh. It is located in Vijayawada, Andhra Pradesh, India.

History 

After the Telangana state formed in 2014, E. S. L. Narasimhan served as the joint governor for both Andhra Pradesh and Telangana until 2019. Later, Biswabhusan Harichandan is appointed as the 2nd governor of Andhra Pradesh. Then, a separate Raj Bhavan was needed for the residence of the governor. Government of Andhra Pradesh, converted the government irrigation house into the Raj Bhavan in 2019.

References

External links 

 rajbhavan.ap.gov.in/

Governors' houses in India
Government buildings in Andhra Pradesh
Buildings and structures in Vijayawada
2019 establishments in Andhra Pradesh